The black-tailed hutia (Mesocapromys melanurus), also known as the bushy-tailed hutia, is a small, furry, rat-like mammal found only in Cuba. It lives in lowland moist forests and is threatened by habitat loss. It is a member of the hutia subfamily (Capromyinae), a group of rodents native to the Caribbean that are mostly endangered or extinct.

Although it was formerly classified in the genus Mysateles, phylogenetic evidence supports it belonging to the genus Mesocapromys.

References

Mesocapromys
Hutias
Mammals of Cuba
Hutia
Vulnerable animals
Mammals described in 1865
Taxonomy articles created by Polbot
Taxobox binomials not recognized by IUCN 
Endemic fauna of Cuba